Choreutis euclista is a moth in the family Choreutidae. It was described by Edward Meyrick in 1918. It is found in India, Sri Lanka and Myanmar.

References

Choreutis
Moths described in 1918